Liverpool Philharmonic Hall is a concert hall in Hope Street, in Liverpool, England.  It is the home of the Royal Liverpool Philharmonic Society and is recorded in the National Heritage List for England as a designated Grade II* listed building.  It is not the original concert hall on the present site; its predecessor was destroyed by fire in 1933 and the present hall was opened in 1939.

Original hall

The Liverpool Philharmonic Society was founded in 1840 but initially did not have a permanent concert hall.  In 1844 the Liverpool architect John Cunningham was appointed to prepare plans for a hall.  The initial requirement was for a "concert room" holding an audience of 1,500 which would cost at least £4,000 (equivalent to £ in ).  Later that year the requirement was increased to a "new concert hall" to accommodate an audience of 2,100 and an orchestra of 250, plus "refreshment and retiring rooms".  Subscribers were invited to both buy shares and to purchase seats along the sides of the hall.  The foundation stone was laid in 1846 and plans were made for Mendelssohn to write a cantata to be played in his presence at the opening of the hall.  Mendelssohn did not live long enough to write the work.

The hall cost £30,000 (equivalent to £ in ) and was opened on 27 August 1849 accompanied by a week long festival. A correspondent for The Times reported that it was "one of the finest and best adapted to music that I ever entered". The correspondent described the interior:

According to The New Grove Dictionary of Music and Musicians, the hall was universally agreed to have superb acoustics. A new organ was installed in the hall in 1930 at a cost of £2,000 (equivalent to £ in ).

The concert hall continued to be the home of the society until a fire broke out during the evening of 5 July 1933. Despite over 100 firemen attending the fire, the hall and new organ were damaged beyond repair. Over 10,000 people stood in the streets around the hall to view the fire. There were no serious injuries – the hall had closed for the day – though two boys fell into the basement while watching the fire and a number of onlookers fainted or collapsed. The next day the chairman of the Philharmonic Society announced that the hall would certainly be rebuilt, saying that until then they would need to find a replacement hall in which to play. The hall contained a number of autograph books dating from 1848; these were contained in a fire-proof safe and thus kept safe along with autographed pictures and some instruments, though the music library was lost. The building was insured, and the insurers paid £84,000 (equivalent to £ in ) for the hall itself, £9,503 (equivalent to £ in ) for other assets, and £6,000 (equivalent to £ in ) for the loss of two years' rental. The exact cause of the fire was not known; only that it originated in the roof of the building. Demolition work on the building's ruins began the next day.

Present hall

History

The building of a new hall was delayed by the demands of Liverpool City Corporation, which announced that it would not support the building of a venue suitable only as a concert hall. The corporation demanded an auditorium equally suited to cinema and theatre use. Controversy ensued with vocal opposition to the corporation's stance led by the doyen of British conductors, Sir Henry Wood. A compromise was reached and work began in June 1937.

Herbert J. Rowse was commissioned to design a new hall on the site of the previous hall. Rowse's design was in Streamline Moderne style.  It incorporated an organ built by the Liverpool firm of Rushworth and Dreaper with a console which can be lowered from the stage.  The hall was officially opened on 19 June 1939, and inaugurated the next day with a concert conducted by Sir Thomas Beecham. The Manchester Guardian commented, "The magnificent compliment Liverpool has paid to the cause of music in England almost takes one's breath away ... a hall of great size, noble proportions, and up-to-date appointments ... ready to take its place among the most eminent homes of musical culture in this or any other country".  The final cost of the hall was a little over £120,000 (equivalent to £ in ) and the architect was paid £6,869 (equivalent to £ in ).  An extension was added to the rear of the hall which was completed in 1992, designed by Brock Carmichael Associates.  A major refurbishment of the hall was carried out in 1995 at a cost of £10.3 million.  This included the complete replacement of the fibrous plaster interior with concrete, carried out again by Brock Carmichael, working with the acoustic consultant firm Lawrence Kirkegaard Associates. A local violinist, John Frederick Clarke, who was part of the famed  orchestra, and the other band members who died during the ship's sinking in 1912 are all commemorated on a memorial plaque within Philharmonic Hall.

A further renovation, costing around £14 million, was completed in October 2015, primarily refurbishing the main concert hall and auditorium, and adding a new performance space named the Music Room.

Architecture

The hall is built with fawn-coloured facing bricks, and is mainly in three storeys.  It has a symmetrical frontage with a canopied entrance flanked by semicircular stair turrets.  Above the entrance are seven windows that are separated by piers surmounted by carved abstract motifs.  Outside the hall and separated from it are two piers for the display of posters.  The architectural historians Pollard and Pevsner and the author of the description in the National Heritage List for England agree that the design of the hall was influenced by the Dutch architect W. M. Dudok.

The windows above the canopy contain glass etched by Hector Whistler. Glass doors panels by Whistler, originally from the building, and depicting musical instruments in art deco style, were featured on the BBC One's Antiques Roadshow in March 2015. Thirteen Pilkington glass panels had been purchased from a market in France by a Liverpool dealer, who expressed an interest in donating some to local museums. The interior of the auditorium is "sensuously curved". On the walls on each side are incised female figures in art deco style that represent "musical moods", also by Thompson. On the back wall above the platform was a kinetic structure, called Adagio, designed by Marianne Forrest in 1995; however this was moved to the nearby Harold Cohen Library at the University of Liverpool in 2016.

The hall contains a 3-manual pipe organ  built by Rushworth and Dreaper, with a console on a lifting platform that can be played on the stage or from the area below the stage, and a Walturdaw rising cinema screen.

Current use
The hall stages over 250 events each year, of which more than 60 are concerts of classical music. The main hall has a capacity of 1,700 with smaller events taking place in the Music, Green and 1840 rooms.  The other shows include music of all genres (including international artists such as Sir Cliff Richard, Bryan Ferry, Brian Wilson, Kraftwerk and Gilbert O'Sullivan), comedians, and films shown on the Walturdaw screen.  Tours of the hall are arranged, and the hall can he hired for corporate or private events, including weddings.

See also
 Grade II* listed buildings in Liverpool – City Centre
 Architecture of Liverpool
 Philharmonic Dining Rooms "The Phil" public house

References
Citations

Sources

External links
 RLPO official site
 What's On at the Philharmonic Hall

Art Deco architecture in Liverpool
Liverpool, Philharmonic Hall
Concert halls in England
Grade II* listed buildings in Liverpool
Music venues in Liverpool
Liverpool, Philharmonic Hall
Tourist attractions in Liverpool
John Cunningham buildings
Hope Street, Liverpool